Illinois Route 162 (IL 162) is a  east–west highway in the southwestern part of the U.S. state of Illinois. It travels from IL 203 in Granite City east to U.S. Route 40 (US 40) near Troy.

Route description 
IL 162 has two lanes except around the Granite City Steel area and at I-55/I-70 and eastward into Troy. It is a main east–west artery between I-55 on the south, and I-270 on the north.

The Illinois Department of Transportation is doing major work on IL 162 at the interchange with I-55/I-70 in Troy. The bridge that carries IL 162 over I-55/I-70 has been the site of several accidents since it was built. The current project is expected to complete by Summer 2012.

History 
State Bond Issue (SBI) Route 162 originally traveled from Spring Valley to LaMoille. In 1938, this was changed to IL 89. In 1954, IL 162 was used on the Glen Carbon-to-Granite City portion of the current road. In 1965, it was extended east to Troy on what was US 40 Bypass.

Major intersections

See also

References

External links

162
Transportation in Madison County, Illinois
U.S. Route 40